Fernando Néstor Pérez (born 11 September 1980) is an Argentine footballer. He most recently played as a striker for Gimnástica de Torrelavega. 
He was the top scorer at the Azerbaijani football club Baku during the 2004-05 season with 13 league goals.

Club

Achievements
Baku
 Azerbaijan Premier League winner (2): 2005–06, 2008–09
 Azerbaijan Cup winner (1): 2004–05

External links
Player profile

References

1980 births
Living people
Argentine footballers
Argentine expatriate footballers
Azerbaijan Premier League players
FC Baku players
Expatriate footballers in Azerbaijan
Association football forwards
Argentine expatriate sportspeople in Azerbaijan